Vikas Anand is an Indian film and television actor who works in Bollywood.

Filmography 

Garm Hava (1973)
Ek Nari Do Roop (1973)
Joshila (1973)
Bidaai (1974)
Deewaar (1975)
 Prem Kahani (1975 film)
Sholay (1975)
Khalifa (1976)
 Hera Pheri (1976 film)
Udhar Ka Sindur (1976)
 Zindagi (1976 film)
Jay Vejay (1977)
Kalabaaz (1977)
Khoon Pasina (1977)
Kasam Khoon Ki (1977)
Doosra Aadmi (1977)
Muqaddar (1978 film)
Chor Ho To Aisa (1978)
Nawab Sahib (1978)
 Chakravyuha (1978 film)
Muqaddar Ka Sikandar (1978)
Inspector Eagle (1979)
Sarkari Mehmaan (1979)
Noorie (1979)
Mr. Natwarlal (1979)
 Kaala Patthar (1979)
 Beqasoor (1980 film)
Dhan Daulat (1980)
Do Aur Do Paanch (1980)
Aasha (1980 film)
Dostana (1980 film)
Maang Bharo Sajana (1980)Jwalamukhi (1980 film)Apna Bana Lo (1983)
 Chhoti Bahoo Aankhen Parampara Raja Babu Aag Bhrashtachar Bidaai Mashaal Bhavna Zindagi Sharaabi 1984 as Lobo
 Khuda Gawah Commander Khiladi Vijaypath Dariya Dil Do Qaidi Krantiveer Plot No. 5 Jai Kishen Joshila 
 Bol Radha Bol Chor Ho To Aisa Jimmy Loha Teri Meherbaniyan Phaansi Ke Baad Adhikar Tirangaa Pyaar Karke Dekho Prateeksha Hatya KhuddarJeevan Daata MajboorLoaferCoolie No.1Kala BazaarPolice Aur MujrimDeewaarBekhudiMard Ki ZabaanJawab Hum DengePolice OfficerAankhen (1993 film)Andaz (1994 film)Chauraha (1994)
 Jung (1996 film)

 Television Adaalat as Chief MinisterStone BoyBuniyaad as HarsharandasHitler Didi'' (2011) as Judge (Special appearance)

References

External links 
 
 

Male actors in Hindi cinema
Indian male film actors
Indian male television actors
Year of birth missing (living people)
Living people
Place of birth missing (living people)